Qushchi Bayram Khvajeh (also Romanized as Qūshchī Bāyrām Khvājeh; also known as Qayah Bāsh Bāyrām Khūyeh) is a village in Abish Ahmad Rural District, Abish Ahmad District, Kaleybar County, East Azerbaijan Province, Iran. At the 2006 census, its population was 399, in 86 families.

References 

Populated places in Kaleybar County